Wugu District is a suburban district in the western part of New Taipei City in northern Taiwan.  It has an area of 34.86 km2 and a population of 90,465 people (2022).

History 
In the 19th century the area was known as Go-ko-khi (also ). Until the creation of New Taipei on 25 December 2010, Wugu was a rural township (Postal: Wuku) in the former Taipei County.

Notorious Kuomintang general Chen Yi was interred in Wugu following his execution.

Tourist attractions
 Mount Guanyin
 New Taipei City Exhibition Hall
 New Taipei Metropolitan Park

Transportation
Wugu is served by the Zhongshan Freeway (National Highway No. 1) and Provincial Highway No. 64

Notable natives
 Lin Chih-chia, Secretary-General of the 9th Legislative Yuan

See also
 New Taipei City

References

External links

  

Districts of New Taipei